The 1970 SMU Mustangs football team represented Southern Methodist University (SMU) as a member of the Southwest Conference (SWC) during the 1970 NCAA University Division football season. Led by ninth-year head coach Hayden Fry, the Mustangs compiled an overall record of 5–6 with a conference mark of 3–4, tying for fourth place in the SWC.

Schedule

Roster

Team players in the NFL

References

SMU
SMU Mustangs football seasons
SMU Mustangs football